Revolutionary Communist Party  (in Spanish: Partido Comunista Revolucionario) was a communist party in Peru.  PCR was formed in 1974, through a split in the Revolutionary Vanguard.  PCR was founded by Manuel Danmert, Agustín Haya and Santiago Pedraglio.

In 1977 PCR launched the UDP. PCR no longer exists.

Electoral participation of PCR
1978: UDP
1980: UNIR
1980 (municipal): IU
1983 (municipal): IU
1985: IU
1986 (municipal): IU
1989 (municipal): ASI
1990: IS

Political parties established in 1974
Communist parties in Peru
1974 establishments in Peru
Defunct political parties in Peru